Kuraginsky District is an administrative and municipal district (raion), one of the forty-three in Krasnoyarsk Krai, Russia. It is located in the southeast of the krai and borders with Balakhtinsky, Mansky, Partizansky, and Sayansky Districts in the north, Nizhneudinsky District of Irkutsk Oblast in the northeast, Todzhinsky District of the Tuva Republic in the southeast, Karatuzsky District in the south, Minusinsky District in the southwest, Krasnoturansky District in the west, and with Idrinsky Districts in the northwest. Its administrative center is the urban locality (an urban-type settlement) of Kuragino. Population:  51,873 (2002 Census);  The population of Kuragino accounts for 28.8% of the district's total population.

Geography
Kuraginsky District is the largest in terms of area in the south of Krasnoyarsk Krai. It is located in the Eastern Sayan mountainous area, which includes Grandiozny Peak, the highest point of Krasnoyarsk Krai.

Climate in the district is strongly continental. Tourist attractions include the Kinzelyuk Waterfall, one of the highest in Russia.

History
The district was founded on April 4, 1924.

Government
As of 2013, the Head of the district and the Chairman of the District Council is Yevgeny D. Dmitriyev.

Economy
The district is a raw-material base for the metallurgical, food-processing, and timber industries.

Transportation
The Abakan-Tayshet railway passes through the district.

Culture
There are thirty-nine clubs, two museums, thirty-six public libraries (with the total book stock numbering ~367,000 volumes), and three music schools.

Education
Thirty-six educational facilities are located in the district.

Public health services
There is one hospital, as well as four clinics. There are on average 1.23 medical workers per 1,000 people.

References

Notes

Sources

Districts of Krasnoyarsk Krai
States and territories established in 1924